Pietro Cavallini (1259 – c. 1330) was an Italian painter and mosaic designer working during the late Middle Ages.

Biography
Little is known about his biography, though it is known he was from Rome, since he signed pictor romanus.

His first notable works were the fresco cycles for the Basilica di San Paolo fuori le Mura, with stories from the New and Old Testament (1277–1285). They were destroyed by the fire of 1823.

His Last Judgment in the Church of Santa Cecilia in Trastevere in Rome, painted c. 1293 and considered Cavallini's masterwork, demonstrates an artistic style known as Roman naturalism.  This naturalism influenced the work of artists working in other Italian cities such as Florence and Siena.

In the Sienese school, the influence of classical Roman forms combined with the Byzantine artistic heritage of the region and with northern Gothic influences to form a naturalized painting style that was one of the origins of International Gothic.

In Florence, the influence of classical Roman forms combined with the Byzantine artistic heritage of the region to spark an interest in volumetric, naturalistic paintings and statuary. This work is in stark contrast to the comparatively flat and ornamented Gothic, International Gothic, and Byzantine styles.

This naturalism is also evident in the Basilica of San Francesco d'Assisi in Assisi, built in the early years of the 13th century in honour of the newly canonized St. Francis. As the shrine was commissioned by the Roman church, its interior is painted in the Roman tradition. The identities of the artists at work in this church are for the most part not known but at least one team of artists came from Rome. Owing to the similarity of the work in San Francesco to that of Florentine artist Giotto, he was traditionally credited with some of the frescoes, although most scholars no longer believe he was involved.

Giotto's work in the Arena Chapel (also known as the Scrovegni Chapel) at Padua strongly shows the influence of stylized Roman naturalism in a newly individualized style which would come to characterize the work of Florentine Renaissance artists.

From 1308 Cavallini worked in Naples at the court of King Charles II of Anjou, notably in the churches of San Domenico Maggiore (1308) and Santa Maria Donnaregina (1317), together with his fellow Roman Filippo Rusuti. He returned to Rome before 1325, beginning the external decoration of the Basilica di San Paolo fuori le Mura in 1321, with a series of Byzantine-style mosaics.

Cavallini's pupils included Giovanni di Bartolommeo.

Works
His works include:
Jael and Tisseran (date unknown), watercolour
Scenes from the life of Mary (c. 1298), mosaics at the apse of Basilica di Santa Maria in Trastevere in Rome. The six scenes were made by the order of Bertoldo Stefaneschi, brother of Cardinal Giacomo Gaetani Stefaneschi, and include a donor portrait of him. These mosaics are praised for their realistic portrayal and attempts at perspective:
Nativity of the Virgin
Annunciation
The Birth of Jesus
Adoration of the Magi
Presentation in the Temple
Dormition
The Last Judgment (1295–1298), part of fresco cycle at Santa Cecilia in Trastevere in Rome.

The apse paintings at San Giorgio al Velabro, Rome, have been attributed to him on the basis of stylistic similarity to the Trastevere paintings.

The apse mosaic of the San Crisogono church in the Trastevere district, depicting the Mary with Sts. Sebastian and Chrysogonos, is also attributed to Cavallini.

The illustrated Clement Bible has been attributed to Cavallini or his workshop.

References

Sources
 Enio Sindona, Pietro Cavallini, editorial Italian Institute, Milan 1958.
 Guglielmo Matthiae, Pietro Cavallini, De Luca, Rome 1972.
 Paul Hetherington, Pietro Cavallini: a study in the art of Late Medieval Rome, The Sagittarius Press, London 1979. 
 Angiola Maria Romanini, The Eyes of Isaac. Classicism and scientific curiosity between Giotto and Arnolfo di Cambio, in "Medieval art", ns, I (1987).
 Emma Simi Varanelli, From Isaac Master in Giotto. Contribution to the history of medieval perspectiva communis, in "Medieval Art", ns III (1989), p. 115-143.
 Serena Romano, Eclipse in Rome: mural painting in Rome and Lazio by Boniface VIII to Martin V (1295-1431), Argos, Rome 1992. 
 Alessandro Parronchi, Cavallini disciple of Giotto, Florence 1994. 
 Pierluigi De Vecchi and Elda Cerchiari, The Times of art, Volume 1 Simon and Schuster, Milano 1999
 Alessandro Tomei, Pietro Cavallini, Silvana, Cinisello Balsamo 2000. 
 Bruno Zanardi, Giotto and Pietro Cavallini: the question of Assisi and the medieval construction of fresco painting, Skira, Milan 2002. 
 Roman paintings of Giotto and Cavallini, catalogue of the exhibition held in Rome in 2004 by Thomas Angelo and Strinati Tartuferi, Electa, Milano 2004.

External links

Pietro Cavallini's The Last Judgement, Smarthistory

1250 births
1330 deaths
Painters from Rome
13th-century Italian painters
Italian male painters
14th-century Italian painters
Trecento painters
Gothic painters
Mosaic artists